Militano is a surname. Notable people with the surname include:

 Mark Militano (born 1954), American figure skater
 Melissa Militano (born 1955), American figure skater

Italian-language surnames